Pablo Ariel Lugüercio (born 10 March 1982) is an Argentine former footballer who played as a striker.

Club career
Lugüercio started his career with Estudiantes in the Primera Division in 2001, and then went on loan to Defensa y Justicia of the 2nd division in 2002. In 2005, Lugüercio played to Peruvian club Universidad San Martín de Porres.

Back in Estudiantes, Lugüercio helped Estudiantes win their first league title in 23 years, when he appeared in the 2-1 championship playoff victory against Boca Juniors on December 13, 2006. In the 2007 Clausura tournament, Lugüercio scored six goals coming from the bench. Following the departure of fellow strikers José Luis Calderón and Mariano Pavone, Lugüercio saw more play time in the 2007-08 season.

But, at the end of the season, he was transferred to Racing Club, where he became a starter. In 2012, he moves to Barcelona de Guayaquil, where he has a short stay of only 6 months. By mid 2012 he was loaned to Arsenal de Sarandí, where he played 26 games, scoring only one goal. He signed to play the 2013-2014 season for Olimpo de Bahía Blanca.

Lugüercio is not a traditional forward; he is known for his good touch and tremendous effort. His nickname is payaso ("clown").

In his career, Lugüercio scored 41 goals in 330 games.

Titles

External links
 Pablo Lugüercio – Argentine Primera statistics at Fútbol XXI  
 

1982 births
Living people
Argentine footballers
Argentine expatriate footballers
Association football forwards
Argentine Primera División players
Primera Nacional players
Peruvian Primera División players
Ecuadorian Serie A players
Barcelona S.C. footballers
Estudiantes de La Plata footballers
Aldosivi footballers
Defensa y Justicia footballers
Club Deportivo Universidad de San Martín de Porres players
Racing Club de Avellaneda footballers
Olimpo footballers
Arsenal de Sarandí footballers
Expatriate footballers in Peru
Expatriate footballers in Ecuador
Footballers from La Plata